In Italian,  (singular  in both languages) are stacks, coastal and oceanic rock formations eroded by waves.

The word may be derived from the Greek  or Latin  ("lighthouse") and is cognate with the Spanish .

They are found at the coasts of several regions of Italy:

Apulia faraglioni
In the Apulia region, examples of  can be found along the Adriatic coast of the Salento peninsula: Le Due Sorelle (The Two Sisters) in Torre Dell'Orso and the Faraglioni di Sant'Andrea. On the Gargano peninsula, there are two faraglioni in Zagare Bay near Mattinata that are protected within Gargano National Park.

Capri 
In the Campania region, there are three famous  in the Bay of Naples, off the island of Capri. Part of the Campanian Archipelago, they are named: 

See also
 Stack (geology)
 Coastal and oceanic landforms

Gallery

References

 

Stacks (geology)
Coastal and oceanic landforms
Rock formations of Italy
Landforms of Apulia
Landforms of Campania
Capri, Campania